Donatella Sacchi (born 16 July 1959) is an Italian former gymnast. She competed at the 1976 Summer Olympics. At the 2020 Summer Olympics, she served as the president of the superior jury evaluating women's artistic gymnastics.

References

External links
 

1959 births
Living people
Italian female artistic gymnasts
Olympic gymnasts of Italy
Gymnasts at the 1976 Summer Olympics
People from Novara
Sportspeople from the Province of Novara